Under the Whyte notation for the classification of steam locomotives,  represents the wheel arrangement of no leading wheels, six powered and coupled driving wheels on three axles, and four trailing wheels on two axles.

Overview
The 0-6-4 wheel arrangement appears to have only been used on tank engines and Single Fairlies. The earliest known example was the Moel Tryfan narrow gauge locomotive, built for use on the North Wales Narrow Gauge Railways. It was a Single Fairlie type, built by the Vulcan Foundry near Manchester in 1875. It was followed by the R class and S class, built by the Avonside Engine Company of England for the New Zealand Railways Department between 1878 and 1881.

Usage

Australia
The South Australian Railways K class locomotives were introduced in 1884, designed by William Thow. They were noted to run more smoothly bunker-first. After the electrification of the Mersey Railway in England, four of its 0-6-4T locomotives were sold to J & A Brown of New South Wales, Australia, where one, number 5, is preserved at the NSW Rail Museum, Thirlmere, New South Wales.

Three members of New Zealand's S class were also sold to the Western Australian Government Railways in 1891.

New Zealand

New Zealand’s R class and S class Single Fairlies were popular with crews and capable of all duties from express passenger trains to shunting tasks. The S class were limited to the Wellington Region when they were introduced, but the R class were distributed throughout the country. All were withdrawn by 1936, but R class no. 28 is preserved as a static exhibit in a Reefton park.

South Africa

Netherlands-South African Railway Company
This wheel arrangement provided the bulk of the motive power for the  Nederlandsche-Zuid-Afrikaansche Spoorwegmaatschappij (NZASM) in the Zuid-Afrikaansche Republiek (ZAR). Between 1893 and 1898, 175 46 Tonner  steam locomotives were placed in service, built by the Maschinenfabrik Esslingen in Germany.

In 1899, twenty more were ordered from the Nederlandse Fabriek van Werktuigen en Spoorwegmaterieel (Werkspoor) in the Netherlands, of which only two were delivered by the time the Imperial Military Railways (IMR) took over all railway operations in the ZAR during the Second Boer War. The other eighteen locomotives in this order were delivered directly to the IMR, who diverted two of them to Lourenço Marques in Mozambique.

At the end of the war, the survivors of these locomotives were taken onto the roster of the Central South African Railways (CSAR) and designated Class B, while the two in Mozambique were taken onto the roster of the Caminhos de Ferro de Mocambique (CFM). In 1912, the remaining CSAR locomotives were assimilated into the South African Railways (SAR).

Mozambique
The CFM eventually had at least thirty 46 Tonner locomotives in service. Between 1897 and 1898, some 46 Tonners were sold by the NZASM to the CFM. The two locomotives which were delivered after the outbreak of the war and diverted to Lourenço Marques upon arrival, were also taken onto the CFM roster at the end of the war. Later, between 1911 and 1920 during the CSAR and SAR eras, six more were sold to the CFM.

United Kingdom

Other than examples for export, 0-6-4T locomotives enjoyed a brief vogue in the United Kingdom prior to the First World War, but were not widely used. Nine locomotives of this type were supplied by Beyer, Peacock & Company for the opening of the Mersey Railway in 1886.

William Dean built three crane tanks in 1901, and Kitson & Company of Leeds supplied nine locomotives to the Lancashire, Derbyshire & East Coast Railway in 1904.

Other examples included the Midland Railway 2000 Class of 1907, the Highland Railway Drummond 0-6-4T Class of 1909, the SECR J class of 1913 and the Metropolitan Railway G Class of 1915. The type was eventually superseded by the popular 2-6-4T locomotive.

United States
In the United States, the 0-6-4 locomotive was largely built only for use in railyards, essentially as an adaptation of an 0-6-0 switch engine with an extended firebox, or a 4-6-0 reconstructed with a larger firebox which necessitated the relocation of the leading wheels to the rear to support the firebox. Some Mason Bogie locomotives used this wheel arrangement.

References

External links

 
 
1875 introductions